Rhys Lewis (born by 1532), of Gladestry, Radnorshire, was a Welsh politician.

He was the eldest son of Ieuan Lewis of Gladestry, MP for Radnorshire.

He was a Member (MP) of the Parliament of England for New Radnor Boroughs in October 1553 and 1558. He was High Sheriff of Radnorshire c.1578.

He married Sibyl, the daughter of Rhys ap Gwilym ap Llywelyn, and had 4 sons.

References

Year of death missing
16th-century Welsh politicians
People from Radnorshire
Members of the Parliament of England (pre-1707) for constituencies in Wales
Year of birth uncertain
English MPs 1553 (Mary I)
English MPs 1558
High Sheriffs of Radnorshire